Zvi Zeitlin (21 February 19222 May 2012) was a Russian-born American classical violinist and teacher.

Born in Dubroŭna (now in Belarus), the son of Jewish parents: a doctor and amateur violinist, Zeitlin won a scholarship at the age of 11 to the Juilliard School of Music in New York, the youngest scholarship student in the institution's history.  He subsequently read Judaic Studies at the Hebrew University of Jerusalem, and served in the Royal Air Force from 1943 to 1946.  Following World War II, he returned to Juilliard for additional studies, with such teachers as Sascha Jacobsen, Louis Persinger, and Ivan Galamian.

The composers Gunther Schuller, Paul Ben-Haim and Carlos Surinach composed violin concertos for Zeitlin, who premiered them. Zeitlin was the first to record George Rochberg's Caprice Variations in their entirety. He was also a particular champion of the violin concerto of Arnold Schoenberg and recorded this work commercially for Deutsche Grammophon.

Zeitlin taught for 45 years at the University of Rochester's Eastman School of Music, from 1967 until his death in 2012. He gave his final recital at Eastman just before his 90th birthday.  During his time at Eastman, he, pianist Barry Snyder, and cellist Robert Sylvester founded the Eastman Trio, and Zeitlin performed with this trio from 1976 to 1982. He also taught summer courses at the Music Academy of the West in California, starting in 1973. From 1962 to 2002, he performed on a rare Cremonese violin by Giuseppe Guarneri del Gesù, the 1734 "Prince Doria", which was initially gifted to him by the Lionel Perera family, before switching to a replica by the contemporary American violinmaker, Gregg T. Alf.

Zeitlin and his wife Marianne Langner Zeitlin were married for 61 years.  The couple had 2 children, Hillel and Leora. His widow and children, his sister Anba Kantor, and six grandchildren and two great-grandchildren survive him.

References

External links 
 University of Rochester page on Zvi Zeitlin

1922 births
2012 deaths
American classical violinists
Male classical violinists
American male violinists
Russian classical violinists
American music educators
Russian music educators
Violin pedagogues
20th-century classical violinists
20th-century American male musicians
Music Academy of the West faculty
Royal Air Force personnel of World War II
Soviet emigrants to the United States
20th-century American violinists
Hebrew University of Jerusalem alumni